The  was the self-defence organisation of the Tsukunft, the youth organisation of the General Jewish Labour Bund in Poland,  between 1929–1939. Its centre was Warsaw, where the shturem had 200–300 members.

References
Jack, Jacobs: Bundist Counterculture in Interwar Poland. New York 2009.

General Jewish Labour Bund in Poland
Organisations based in Warsaw
Jewish youth organizations